Yusuke Okada may refer to:
 Yusuke Okada (basketball)
 Yusuke Okada (wrestler)